Gershon-Yitskhok Leibovich Sirota (187419 April 1943) was one of the leading cantors of Europe during the "Golden Age of Hazzanut" (cantorial music), sometimes referred to as the "Jewish Caruso".

Biography
Sirota began his cantorial career in Odessa, then spent eight years in Vilna as cantor of the Shtatshul (State Synagogue) there. It was in Vilna that he began his collaboration with choirmaster Leo Lowe, which would continue throughout his career. He performed on numerous occasions throughout Europe, and in 1902 he sang at a reception in honor of Theodor Herzl, the founder of the Zionist Movement.

In 1907, Sirota assumed the position of cantor at the prestigious Tłomackie Street Synagogue in Warsaw. He continued his concert appearances around Europe, and even sang in Carnegie Hall in New York City to a sold out crowd. While cantor at the Tłomackie Synagogue, he also began recording his music. The first Jewish records, made in Vienna, Berlin, and St. Petersburg and spread across the whole Jewish world, were of the two famous cantors: Gershon Sirota and Zavel Kwartin. As the technology improved, he was constantly rerecording the songs, so that listeners can trace the improvement of his rich tenor voice over the years.

While Sirota eventually left the synagogue over disputes concerning his frequent performances, he continued to live in Warsaw. Nevertheless, he travelled frequently, and his concerts were attended by Jewish and gentile audiences alike—and according to some accounts, even by Caruso.

Caught in Warsaw during the Nazi invasion of Poland during World War II, he spent his final years living in the Warsaw Ghetto, and died in the Warsaw Ghetto Uprising in 1943.

References

External links
 Gershon Sirota recordings at the Discography of American Historical Recordings.
Recordings online
Biography of Sirota

1874 births
1943 deaths
Musicians from Odesa
Polish Jews who died in the Holocaust
Hazzans
People who died in the Warsaw Ghetto
Odesa Jews
Polish civilians killed in World War II